Breezeline (previously Atlantic Broadband) is the trade name for the United States operations of Cogeco Communications, constituting the 8th largest cable operator in the United States, based on the number of television service customers served. The company currently provides TV, Internet and phone services using a combined coaxial cable & fiber-to-the-premises (FTTP) network. Breezeline currently has approximately 707,000 broadband customers located in twelve states: New Hampshire, Maine, Connecticut, New York, Pennsylvania, Delaware, Maryland, Ohio, West Virginia, Virginia, South Carolina, and Florida. The company is headquartered in Quincy, Massachusetts.

History
Breezeline was formed as Atlantic Broadband in 2004 through the acquisition of nonstrategic regions from Charter Communications, later growing with the acquisition of properties from MetroCast, G Force Cable, and WOW!.

On July 18, 2012, it was announced that Cogeco would be purchasing Atlantic Broadband for US$1.36 billion. 
Originally spun off from Charter, Atlantic at the time was the 14th largest cable group in the U.S. market, it was owned by Abry Partners IV, L.P. and Oak Hill Capital (the private equity firm run by Robert M. Bass).

In 2018, Cogeco acquired MetroCast and merged it with the Atlantic Broadband system. MetroCast networks covered around 236,000 homes and businesses in New Hampshire, Maine, Pennsylvania, Maryland and Virginia and served about 120,000 Internet, 76,000 cable and 37,000 telephone customers.

In 2020, Atlantic Broadband announced that it had signed an agreement to acquire Thames Valley Communications, a broadband services company operating in Southeastern Connecticut.

On June 30, 2021, it was announced that Atlantic Broadband would be purchasing the Ohio markets of Columbus and Cleveland from WOW! in a deal valued at $1.125 billion USD The WOW! Ohio broadband systems Atlantic Broadband will be purchasing pass approximately 688,000 homes and businesses in Cleveland and Columbus and serve approximately 196,000 Internet, 61,000 video and 35,000 telephony customers, as of March 31, 2021. On September 1, 2021 Atlantic Broadband closed the transaction to acquire WOW!'s Ohio markets.

In January 2022, the company announced it would be adopting the new "Breezeline" brand, as the Atlantic Broadband name does not accurately reflect the provider's current geographical reach, which now stretches into the Midwest and Deep South.

Internet availability by state

Network availability by city

See also
Cable television in the United States
List of United States telephone companies
List of multiple-system operators
List of wired multiple-system broadband providers in Massachusetts (by municipality)

References

External links

Quincy, Massachusetts
Companies based in Norfolk County, Massachusetts
Companies based in Massachusetts
Cable television companies of the United States
Telecommunications companies based in Massachusetts
Cogeco
Charter Communications
Corporate spin-offs
Telecommunications companies established in 2004
2012 mergers and acquisitions
American subsidiaries of foreign companies